Basilissopsis is a genus of sea snails, marine gastropod mollusks in the family Seguenziidae.

In 1897 Dautzenberg and Fischer created this new genus for their specimen of Basilissopsis watsoni, based on the shell characteristics of discolored specimens that were non-nacreous and lacked labral sinuses. This was however contradicted later by the discovery of other species in this genus that possess nacre and labral sinuses. This puts this genus in the family Seguenziidae.

Description
Nothing is known of the anatomy of the soft body in these species. The conical shell has peripheral carina and  collabral axial riblets. All whorls contain midwhorl angulation but spiral lirae are absent. The U-shaped posterior sinus is shallow. There is no anterolateral sinus. A basal sinus is present. A columellar sinus is lacking. The aperture has a rhomboidal shape. A columellar tooth is lacking. The umbilicus contains a septum. The shell has no microsculpture. There are no data about the radula.

Species
Species within the genus Basilissopsis include:
 Basilissopsis athenae Hoffman, Gofas & Freiwald, 2020
Basilissopsis bassa Lima, Christoffersen & Villacampa, 2014 
Basilissopsis charcoti Marshall, 1991
Basilissopsis hakuhoae Kurihara & Ohta, 2008
Basilissopsis oxytropis (Watson, 1879)
Basilissopsis regina (Marshall, 1983)
Basilissopsis rhyssa (Dall, 1927)
 Basilissopsis vanheugteni Hoffman & Freiwald, 2017
Basilissopsis watsoni Dautzenberg & Fischer, 1897

References

 Marshall B.A. (1991). Mollusca Gastropoda : Seguenziidae from New Caledonia and the Loyalty Islands. In A. Crosnier & P. Bouchet (Eds) Résultats des campagnes Musorstom, vol. 7. Mémoires du Muséum National d'Histoire Naturelle, A, 150:41-109.

 
Seguenziidae
Gastropod genera